Benjamin Acheampong (born 15 May 1990) is a Ghanaian professional footballer who plays as a striker and he is also a member of the Ghana national team.

Club career

Coruxo FC
Acheampong joined the first team of Spanish club Coruxo FC at the beginning of the 2010–11 season, and played for Coruxo FC until the end of the 2010–11 season.

Asante Kotoko
Acheampong signed for Ghanaian Ghana Premier League club Asante Kotoko from Coruxo FC at the beginning of the 2011–12 season. In his first season with Asante Kotoko he has won the 2011–12 Ghana Premier League season.

Zamalek 
In February 2021, Acheampong revealed that he had been duped out of $1 million by the Egyptian club who used contract clauses to avoid paying the sum.

International career

Ghana national team
On 16 May 2012, Acheampong was called up to the Ghana squad for two, 2014 FIFA World Cup qualification matches against Lesotho national football team and Zambia national football team.

Honours

Club 
Asante Kotoko
 Ghana Premier League (1): 2011–12

References

1990 births
Living people
Association football forwards
Segunda División B players
Coruxo FC players
Asante Kotoko S.C. players
Atlético Petróleos de Luanda players
Ghana Premier League players
Qatari Second Division players
Ghanaian footballers
Expatriate footballers in Jordan
Shabab Al-Aqaba Club players
Footballers from Kumasi
El Dakhleya SC players
Zamalek SC players
Petrojet SC players
Al-Shamal SC players
Egyptian Premier League players
African Games gold medalists for Ghana
African Games medalists in football
Expatriate footballers in Qatar
Competitors at the 2011 All-Africa Games